Detroit Wheels may refer to 

Detroit Wheels, football team
Detroit Wheels (ABA), basketball team
Detroit Wheels (soccer), soccer team
The Detroit Wheels, Mitch Ryder's backup band